Euthecta cordeiroi, the Cordeiro's buff, is a butterfly in the family Lycaenidae. It is found in north-eastern Tanzania. The habitat consists of gallery forests at altitudes above 1,000 meters.

Adults have been recorded on wing in March, May and August.

References

Endemic fauna of Tanzania
Butterflies described in 2004
Poritiinae